"Bésame" (English: "Kiss Me") is a song by Peruvian singer-songwriter Gian Marco released by Enjoymusic as the lead single of his thirteenth studio album Intuición.

Background and release
Gian Marco stated that the song was born when he was alone playing his charango which he states he always has with him because he feels the need to include something from his homeland. The song was released on June 18, 2018 on all digital platforms. A lyric video for the song was released on the same day on Gian Marco's official YouTube channel. The song  topped the iTunes charts in Perú on the day of its release and became one of the most streamed songs on Spotify in Perú. It is considered as one of the best songs from the album.

Commercial performance and reception
The song had airplay success in Perú entering the charts from 2018-2019. It was well received by his fan base and it also helped Gian Marco get a bunch of new listeners on streaming platforms.

Live performance
Gian Marco first performed the song two days before its original release on Un Nuevo Día. He was invited as a special guest due  to the first game of Perú vs Denmark on June 16, 2018 for the 2018 FIFA World Cup.

Music video
The video for "Bésame" was released on July 17, 2018 on Gian Marco's official channel. The video shows Gian Marco singing the song in a gas station diner playing his charango.

Charts

Weekly charts

Year-end charts

References

Gian Marco songs
2018 singles
Spanish-language songs
2018 songs
Songs written by Gian Marco